The National Paralympic Games are high-level multi-sport events held at the national level by the International Paralympic Committee and national Paralympic Committees in non-Olympic years. The events provide competitions for disabled athletes.

The Games started in 1948. A man by the name of Ludwig Guttmann created the events and competition for World War 2 veterans that had spinal injuries.

Sports 
In the Paralympic Games they divide the athletes into different categories based on their disability the categories include:

Amputee:-Athletes with a partial or total loss of at least one limb.

Cerebral Palsy:-Athletes with non-progressive brain damage, for example cerebral palsy, traumatic brain injury, stroke or similar disabilities affecting muscle control, balance or coordination.

Intellectual Disability:-Athletes with a significant impairment in intellectual functioning and associated limitations in adaptive behaviour (currently suspended.)

Wheelchair:-Athletes with spinal cord injuries and other disabilities which require them to compete in a wheelchair.

Visually Impaired:-Athletes with vision impairment ranging from partial vision, sufficient to be judged legally blind, to total blindness.

Athletes with a physical disability that does not fall strictly under one of the other five categories, such as dwarfism, multiple sclerosis or congenital deformities of the limbs such as that caused by thalidomide.

The events that the athletes can participate in are IPC Alpine Skiing, Archery, IPC Athletics, Biathlon, Boccia, Canoe, Cross-country skiing, Cycling, Equestrian, Football 5-a-side, Football 7-a-a-side, Goalball, IPC Iced Sledge Hockey, Judo, IPC Powerlifting, Rowing, Sailing, IPC Shooting, Sitting Volleyball, IPC Swimming, Table tennis, Triathlon, Wheelchair Basketball, Wheelchair curling, Wheelchair dance, Wheelchair fencing, Wheelchair rugby, and Wheelchair tennis.

List of national Paralympics
 Canadian Paralympic Athletics Championships
 National Paralympic Games of China

References

External links
Paralympic Games - Information, News and Events 

Paralympic Games
 
Disabled multi-sport events